The Los Archipelago worm lizard (Cynisca leonina) is a worm lizard species in the family Amphisbaenidae. It is endemic to Guinea-Bissau and Guinea.

References

Cynisca (lizard)
Reptiles described in 1885
Taxa named by Fritz Müller (doctor)